John Chamberlain Ward (August 27, 1873 – February 15, 1949) was second bishop of the Episcopal Diocese of Erie, now Northwestern Pennsylvania between 1921 and 1943.

Biography 
Ward was born on August 27, 1873 in Elmira, New York, the son of Hamilton Ward and May Adelia Chamberlain. He studied at Harvard College and graduated in 1896. He then studied at the General Theological Seminary, from here he graduated in 1899. He was ordained deacon on May 28, 1899 and priest on May 27, 1900, both by William David Walker, Bishop of Western New York. He then became rector of St Stephen's Church in Buffalo, New York, while in 1902 he became rector of Grace Church in Buffalo, New York, where he remained till 1921, except for the two years he spent as a military chaplain during WWI.

Ward was elected Bishop of Erie on April 12, 1921, on the twenty second ballot, during a special diocesan convention He was consecrated to the episcopate on September 22, 1921 by Presiding Bishop Daniel S. Tuttle, in Grace Church, Buffalo, New York. He retained the post till his retirement in 1943. He died in Buffalo, New York on February 15, 1949.

For service in the First World War, he received the Purple Heart, Distinguished Service Cross, British Military Cross, and the Croix de Guerre. After retirement on June 1, 1943, he was rejected at the age of 69 for military enlistment and subsequently lived at the Buffalo Club until his death.

His brother was New York State Attorney General Hamilton Ward, Jr.

References 

1873 births
1949 deaths
American Episcopalians
American military personnel of World War I
Recipients of the Croix de Guerre 1914–1918 (France)
General Theological Seminary alumni
Recipients of the Distinguished Service Cross (United States)
Harvard College alumni
Episcopal bishops of Northwestern Pennsylvania